Org 28312  is a drug developed by Organon International which acts as a potent cannabinoid receptor full agonist at both the CB1 and CB2 receptors. It was developed with the aim of finding a water-soluble cannabinoid agonist suitable for intravenous use as an analgesic, but did not proceed to human trials, with the related compound Org 28611 chosen instead due to its better penetration into the brain. The structure-activity relationships of these compounds have subsequently been investigated further leading to the development of a number of more potent analogues, derived by cyclisation around the indole or piperazine rings.

See also
 LBP-1
 Org 28611

References 

Cannabinoids
Indoles
Piperazines